William Salkeld was a politician in Queensland, Australia. He was a Member of the Queensland Legislative Assembly.  He represented the electorate of Ipswich from 21 August 1883 to 5 May 1888 and the electorate of Fassifern from 10 May 1888 to 6 May 1893.

Early life 
William Salkeld was born in January 1842 at Melmerby, Cumberland, England, being the son of John Salkeld and Annie (née Nicholson). He was educated at Richmond's Private School, Gamblesby, England. Salkeld arrived in Queensland in 1886 and was a storekeeper in Ipswich. He was a partner in Hughes and Cameron, auctioneers, and in 1900 owned the Mount Brisbane Sawmill.  He married Margaret Davis in Ipswich in Ipswich on 29 November 1875 and had one son.

Later life 
William Salkeld died on the 28 June 1901 in Ipswich, Queensland, from heart failure.

References

Members of the Queensland Legislative Assembly
1842 births
1901 deaths
19th-century Australian politicians